Huelma is a city located in the province of Jaén, Spain. According to the 2010 census (INE), the city had a population of 6,208 inhabitants.

Etymology 
Its name dates from the 11th or 13th century Arabic Walda(t) al-ma a'water source'. One possible origin for the name Huelma is from Bereber Guelma as in the Argelian homonymous city of Guelma.

Nature 

Huelma´s municipality is located in the natural park of Parque natural de Sierra Mágina, located around the Sierra Mágina mountain range. There are hiking trails to the Pico Mágina mountain and BTT tracks through the mountain. Geological sights like the Sierra Mágina karsts and the Cabeza Montosa guyot or tablemount are given.

History 
The Jandulilla river valley has been populated since ancient times with iberic remains found at the Cortijo del Pajarillo. Since the Pacto de Jaén signed between king Ferdinand III of Castile and the nasrid king Muhammad I of Granada the area from Jódar to Montejícar castle was a land of frontier between both kingdoms for almosto two centuries. Finally, in 1438 it was taken for the Castilians by Íñigo López de Mendoza, 1st Marquis of Santillana. Later, in 1463 Henry IV of Castile gave the manor and ownership of Huelma to Diego Fernández de la Cueva, 1st Viscount of Huelma. Both the Castle of the Viscounts of Huelma and the   Inmaculada Concepción Church, built by architect Andrés de Vandelvira, were built in the 16th century in Spanish Renaissance style. The Castle is in ruins since the 17th century but the Church stands as Vanderlviras finest work.

During the 19th century the Spanish confiscation seizes and sales the former Order of Saint Augustine Convent that once stood beside the town hall. The works of the geographic Diccionario geográfico-estadístico-histórico de España y sus posesiones de Ultramar describe Huelma during the 19th century and its XVII grid plan.

Main sights 
Huelma has been recognized with five Bienes de Interés Cultural (BIC) which are the 16th century Castle of Huelma or Castle of the Duke of Alburquerque, the notable renaissance church of Inmaculada Concepción built by Andrés de Vandelvira, the XV century Solera Castle in the village of Solera which was renovated in 2006, the Iberian archeological site of Cortijo El Pajarillo (the archaeological findings are located in the Iberian Museum of Jaén) and Huelma´s historic centre.

Notable natives 
 Rafael Lopez Guzman, art history professor at the University of Granada
 Sebastián Martos, athlete

See also
Pico Mágina

External links 
 Andalucia.org - Official Tourist Office of Andalucía - Huelma
 Andalucia.org - Official Tourist Office of Andalucía - Sierra Mágina

References

Municipalities in the Province of Jaén (Spain)